The M–sigma (or M–σ) relation is an empirical correlation between the stellar velocity dispersion σ of a galaxy bulge and the mass M of the supermassive black hole at its center.

The M–σ relation was first presented in 1999 during a conference at the Institut d'astrophysique de Paris in France. The proposed form of the relation, which was called the "Faber–Jackson law for black holes", was

where  is the solar mass. Publication of the relation in a refereed journal, by two groups, took place the following year.
 
One of many recent studies, based on the growing sample of published black hole masses in nearby galaxies, gives

Earlier work demonstrated a relationship between galaxy luminosity and black hole mass, which nowadays has a comparable level of scatter.  The M–σ relation is generally interpreted as implying some source of mechanical feedback between the growth of supermassive black holes and the growth of galaxy bulges, although the source of this feedback is still uncertain.

Discovery of the M–σ relation was taken by many astronomers to imply that supermassive black holes are fundamental components of galaxies. Prior to about 2000, the main concern had been the simple detection of black holes, while afterward the interest changed to understanding the role of supermassive black holes as a critical component of galaxies. This led to the main uses of the relation to estimate black hole masses in galaxies that are too distant for direct mass measurements to be made, and to assay the overall black hole content of the Universe.

Origin
The tightness of the M–σ relation suggests that some kind of feedback acts to maintain the connection between black hole mass and stellar velocity dispersion, in spite of processes like galaxy mergers and gas accretion that might be expected to increase the scatter over time.
One such mechanism was suggested by Joseph Silk and Martin Rees in 1998. These authors proposed a model in which supermassive black holes first form via collapse of giant 
gas clouds before most of the bulge mass has turned into stars. The black holes created in this way would then accrete and radiate, driving a wind which acts back on the accretion flow.
The flow would stall if the rate of deposition of mechanical energy into the infalling gas was large enough to unbind the protogalaxy in one crossing time. The Silk and Rees model predicts 
However, the predicted normalization of the relation is too small by about a factor of one thousand. The reason is that there is far more energy released in the formation of a supermassive black hole than is needed to completely unbind the stellar bulge.

A more successful feedback model was first presented by Andrew King at the University of Leicester in 2003. In King's model, feedback occurs through momentum transfer, rather than energy transfer as in the case of Silk & Rees's model. A "momentum-driven flow" is one in which the gas cooling time is so short that essentially all the energy in the flow is in the form of bulk motion. In such a flow, most of the energy released by the black hole is lost to radiation, and only a few percent is left to affect the gas mechanically.

Importance
Before the M–σ relation was discovered in 2000, a large discrepancy existed between black hole masses derived using three techniques.
Direct, or dynamical, measurements based on the motion of stars or gas near the black hole seemed to give masses that averaged ≈1% of the bulge mass (the "Magorrian relation"). Two other techniques—reverberation mapping in active galactic nuclei, and the Sołtan argument, which computes the cosmological density in black holes needed to explain the quasar light—both gave a mean value of M/Mbulge that was a factor ≈10 smaller than implied by the Magorrian relation. The M–σ relation resolved this discrepancy by showing that most of the direct black hole masses published prior to 2000 were significantly in error, presumably because the data on which they were based were of insufficient quality to resolve the black hole's dynamical sphere of influence.

A common use of the M–σ relation is to estimate black hole masses in distant galaxies using the easily  measured quantity σ. Black hole masses in thousands of galaxies have been estimated in this way. The M–σ relation is also used to calibrate so-called secondary and tertiary mass estimators, which relate the black hole mass to the strength of emission lines from hot gas in the nucleus or to the velocity dispersion of gas in the bulge.

The tightness of the M–σ relation has led to suggestions that every bulge must contain a supermassive black hole. However, the number of galaxies in which the effect of the black hole's gravity on the motion of stars or gas is unambiguously seen is still quite small.  It is unclear whether the lack of black hole detections in many galaxies implies that these galaxies do not contain black holes; or that their masses are significantly below the value implied by the M–σ relation; or that the data are simply too poor to reveal the presence of the black hole.

The smallest supermassive black hole with a well-determined mass has . The existence of black holes in the mass range  ("intermediate-mass black holes") is predicted by the M–σ relation in low-mass galaxies, and the existence of intermediate-mass black holes has been reasonably well established in a number of galaxies that contain active galactic nuclei, although the values of Mbh in these galaxies are very uncertain.
No clear evidence has been found for ultra-massive black holes with masses above , although this may be an expected consequence of the observed upper limit to σ.

See also
Faber–Jackson relation
Galaxy formation and evolution
Sigma-D relation

References

Astrophysics
Galaxies
Supermassive black holes
Equations of astronomy
Unsolved problems in astronomy